Enewton is a genus in the family Cypridinidae. The genus contains bioluminescent species, and in particular is one of the Caribbean genera of bioluminescent ostracods that perform stereotyped bioluminescent mating displays.

References

Bioluminescent ostracods
Ostracod genera